Adibendan is an inhibitor of phosphodiesterase 3. It has been tested in dogs for its effects on heart output and dilation of blood vessels.

References

Phosphodiesterase inhibitors
Benzimidazoles